Irfan-ul-Haq (born 8 April 1996) is an Indian cricketer. He made his Twenty20 debut on 9 November 2021, for Jammu & Kashmir in the 2021–22 Syed Mushtaq Ali Trophy.

References

External links
 

1996 births
Living people
Indian cricketers
Jammu and Kashmir cricketers
Place of birth missing (living people)